Daviesia hakeoides is a species of flowering plant in the family Fabaceae and is endemic to the south-west of Western Australia. It is a shrub with many tangled stems, scattered sharply-pointed phyllodes and yellow or orange and dark red flowers.

Description

Taxonomy
Daviesia hakeoides was first formally described in 1844 by English botanist Carl Meissner in Lehmann's Plantae Preissianae. The specific epithet (hakeoides) means "Hakea-like".

In 1995, Michael Crisp described two subspecies and the names are accepted by the Australian Plant Census:
Daviesia hakeoides subsp. subnuda (Benth.)

Distribution and habitat
This hakea grows in open forest and woodland from Kalbarri to near Albany and inland to the wheatbelt. Subspecies seminuda grows in drier places further inland than the autonym, more often in kwongan from Yuna to Mount Barker and the wheatbelt.

Conservation status
Both subspecies of D. hakeoides are listed as "not threatened" by the Department of Biodiversity, Conservation and Attractions.

References

External links

Daviesia hakeoides occurrence data from Australasian Virtual Herbarium

hakeoides
Plants described in 1844
Taxa named by Carl Meissner
Rosids of Western Australia